Frederick Flowers (4 March 1864 – 14 December 1928) was an English-born Australian politician.

Early life 
He was born in Dilhorne in Staffordshire to gardener William Flowers and Dorothy Robinson. He migrated to New South Wales around 1882 and worked as a painter and plasterer.

Personal life 
On 26 January 1888 he married Annie Foster, with whom he had four children.

Career 
He joined the United Painters' Trade Society and was its representative on the Trades and Labor Council, of which he was vice-president in 1892. In 1894 he was chairman of the Labor Electoral League, and he was the first president of the Political Labor League from 1895 to 1898. In 1900 he was appointed to the New South Wales Legislative Council as a rare Labor nominee. With the election of a Labor government in 1910 he became Vice-President of the Executive Council, and led the government in the upper house. He was Secretary for Lands from August to November 1911, Colonial Secretary for a few weeks in November 1911, Minister of Public Instruction from November 1911 to February 1912, and Minister of Public Health from 1914 to 1915. In 1915 he was elected President of the Council. He split with the Labor Party over conscription in the 1916 Labor split, however he did not join the Nationalist Party.

References

 

|-

1864 births
1928 deaths
Australian Labor Party members of the Parliament of New South Wales
Nationalist Party of Australia members of the Parliament of New South Wales
Members of the New South Wales Legislative Council
Presidents of the New South Wales Legislative Council